Sir Richard Stafford Cripps  (24 April 1889 – 21 April 1952) was a British Labour Party politician, barrister, and diplomat.

A wealthy lawyer by background, he first entered Parliament at a by-election in 1931, and was one of a handful of Labour frontbenchers to retain his seat at the general election that autumn. He became a leading spokesman for the left-wing and co-operation in a Popular Front with Communists before 1939, in which year he was expelled from the Labour Party.

During World War II, he served as Ambassador to the USSR (1940–42), during which time he grew wary of the Soviet Union, but achieved great public popularity because on being invaded by Nazi Germany the USSR stated its co-operation with the Allies and restoring peace, causing Cripps to be seen in 1942 as a potential rival to Winston Churchill for the premiership. He became a member of the War Cabinet of the wartime coalition, but failed in his efforts (the "Cripps Mission") to resolve the wartime crisis in India, where his proposals were too radical for Churchill and the Cabinet, and too conservative for Mahatma Gandhi and other Indian leaders. He later served as Minister of Aircraft Production, an important post but outside the inner War Cabinet.

Cripps rejoined the Labour Party in 1945, and after the war; served in the Attlee ministry, first as President of the Board of Trade and between 1947 and 1950 as Chancellor of the Exchequer. Labour party member and historian Kenneth O. Morgan claimed of his role in the latter position that he was "the real architect of the rapidly improving economic picture and growing affluence from 1952 onwards".

The economy improved after 1947, benefiting from American money given through grants from the Marshall Plan as well as loans. However, the pound had to be devalued in 1949. He kept the wartime rationing system in place to hold down consumption during an "age of austerity", promoted exports and maintained full employment with static wages. The public especially respected "his integrity, competence, and Christian principles".

Early life

Cripps was born in Chelsea, London, the son of Charles Cripps, a barrister and later Conservative MP, and the former Theresa Potter, the sister of Beatrice Webb and Catherine Courtney. Cripps grew up in a wealthy family and was educated at Winchester College, where the Headmaster described him as "a thoroughly good fellow" and at University College London, where he studied chemistry. He left science for the law, and in 1913 was called to the bar by the Middle Temple. He served in the First World War as a Red Cross ambulance driver in France, and then managed a chemical factory producing armaments. He practised as a barrister during the 1920s, where he specialised in patent cases, and was reported to be the highest paid lawyer in England. He was appointed a King's Counsel in 1927.

Cripps was a member of the Church of England and in the 1920s became a leader in the World Alliance to Promote International Friendship through the Churches, as his father had been. From 1923 to 1929 Cripps was the group's treasurer and its most energetic lecturer.

Joining the Labour Party
At the end of the 1920s, Cripps moved to the left in his political views, and in 1930 he joined the Labour Party. The next year, he was appointed Solicitor-General in the second Labour government, and received the then customary knighthood. In 1931, Cripps was elected in a by-election for Bristol East. During this time in Parliament, he was a strong proponent of Marxist social and economic policies, although he had strong faith in evangelical Christianity, and did not subscribe to the Marxist rejection of religion.

In the 1931 general election, Cripps was one of only three former Labour ministers to hold his seat, alongside George Lansbury, who subsequently became party leader, and Clement Attlee, who became his deputy.

In 1932, Cripps helped found and became the leader of the Socialist League, which was composed largely of intellectuals and teachers from the Independent Labour Party who rejected its decision to disaffiliate from Labour. The Socialist League put the case for an austere form of democratic socialism. He argued that on taking power the Labour Party should immediately enact an Emergency Powers Act, allowing it to rule by decree and thus "forestall any sabotage by financial interests,” and also immediately abolish the House of Lords.

In 1936, Labour's National Executive Committee dissociated itself from a speech in which Cripps said he did not "believe it would be a bad thing for the British working class if Germany defeated us". Cripps also opposed British rearmament:
"Money cannot make armaments. Armaments can only be made by the skill of the British working class, and it is the British working class who would be called upon to use them. To-day you have the most glorious opportunity that the workers have ever had if you will only use the necessity of capitalism in order to get power yourselves. The capitalists are in your hands. Refuse to make munitions, refuse to make armaments, and they are helpless. They would have to hand the control of the country over to you".

Cripps was an early advocate of a united front against the rising threat of fascism and he opposed an appeasement policy towards Nazi Germany. In 1936 he was the moving force behind a Unity Campaign, involving the Socialist League, the Independent Labour Party and the Communist Party of Great Britain, designed to forge electoral unity against the right. Opposed by the Labour leadership, the Unity Campaign failed in its intentions. Rather than face expulsion from Labour, Cripps dissolved the Socialist League in 1937. Tribune, set up as the campaign's newspaper by Cripps and George Strauss, survived. In early 1939, however, Cripps was expelled from the Labour Party for his advocacy of a Popular Front with the Communist Party, the Independent Labour Party, the Liberal Party and anti-appeasement Conservatives.

Second World War

When Winston Churchill formed his wartime coalition government in 1940 he appointed Cripps Ambassador to the Soviet Union in the view that Cripps, who had Marxist sympathies, could negotiate with Joseph Stalin who had a nonaggression pact with Nazi Germany through the Molotov–Ribbentrop Pact. When Hitler attacked the Soviet Union in June 1941, Cripps became a key figure in forging an alliance between the western powers and the Soviet Union.

In 1942, Cripps returned to Britain and made a broadcast about the Soviet war effort. The popular response was phenomenal, and Cripps rapidly became one of the most popular politicians in the country, despite having no party backing. He was appointed a member of the War Cabinet, with the jobs of Lord Privy Seal and Leader of the House of Commons, and was considered for a short period after his return from Moscow as a rival to Churchill in his hold on the country.

Mission to India

Churchill responded by sending Cripps to India on a mission ("the Cripps Mission") to negotiate an agreement with the nationalist leaders that would keep India loyal to the British war effort in exchange for self-government after the war. Cripps designed the specific proposals himself, but they were too radical for Churchill and the Viceroy, and too conservative for the Indians, who demanded immediate independence. No middle way was found and the mission was a failure.

Minister of Aircraft Production
In November 1942, Cripps stepped down from being Leader of the House of Commons and was appointed Minister of Aircraft Production, a position outside the War Cabinet in which he served with substantial success until May 1945, when the wartime coalition ended. A supporter of Air Chief Marshal Harris's strategic bombing campaign against Germany, Cripps stated in a July 1943 broadcast that "the more we ... can destroy from the air the industrial and transport facilities of the Axis, the weaker will become his resistance. ... The heavier our air attack, the lighter will be the total of our casualties".

Cripps was unhappy with the British black propaganda campaign against Germany. When Cripps discovered what Sefton Delmer was involved with (through the intervention of Richard Crossman) he wrote to Anthony Eden, then Foreign Secretary: "If this is the sort of thing that is needed to win the war, why, I'd rather lose it." Delmer was defended by Robert Bruce Lockhart who pointed out the need to reach the sadist in the German nature.

In February 1945, Cripps rejoined the Labour Party.

After the war
When Labour won the 1945 general election, Clement Attlee appointed Cripps President of the Board of Trade, the second most important economic post in the government. Although still a strong socialist, Cripps had modified his views sufficiently to be able to work with mainstream Labour ministers. In Britain's desperate post-war economic circumstances, Cripps became associated with the policy of "austerity". As an upper-class socialist, he held a puritanical view of society, enforcing rationing with equal severity against all classes. Together with other individuals, he was instrumental in the foundation of the original College of Aeronautics, now Cranfield University, in 1946. The Stafford Cripps Learning and Teaching Centre on Cranfield's campus is named after him.

In 1946, Soviet jet engine designers approached Stalin with a request to buy jet designs from Western sources to overcome design difficulties. Stalin is said to have replied: "What fool will sell us his secrets?" However, he gave his assent to the proposal, and Soviet scientists and designers travelled to the United Kingdom to meet Cripps and request the engines. To Stalin's amazement, Cripps and the Labour government were perfectly willing to provide technical information on the Rolls-Royce Nene centrifugal-flow jet engine designed by RAF officer Frank Whittle, along with discussions of a licence to manufacture Nene engines. The Nene engine was promptly reverse-engineered and produced in modified form as the Soviet Klimov VK-1 jet engine, later incorporated into the MiG-15 which flew in time to deploy in combat against UN forces in North Korea in 1950, causing the loss of several B-29 bombers and cancellation of their daylight bombing missions over North Korea.

Also in 1946, Cripps returned to India as part of the "Cabinet Mission", which proposed formulae for independence to the Indian leaders. The other two members of the delegation were Lord Pethick-Lawrence, the Secretary of State for India, and A. V. Alexander, the First Lord of the Admiralty. However, the solution devised by the three men, known as the Cabinet Mission Plan, was unsatisfactory to the Indian National Congress mainly its principal leaders, and instead of having to hold together the emerging one nation, Indian National Congress leaders travelled further down the road that eventually led to Partition.

In 1947, amid a growing economic and political crisis, Cripps tried to persuade Attlee to retire in favour of Ernest Bevin; however, Bevin was in favour of Attlee remaining. Cripps was instead appointed to the new post of Minister for Economic Affairs. Six weeks later Hugh Dalton resigned as Chancellor of the Exchequer and Cripps succeeded him, with the position of Minister for Economic Affairs now merged into the Chancellorship. He increased taxes and continued strategic rationing which muted consumption to boost the balance of trade and stabilise the Pound Sterling seeing Britain trade its way out of a real risk of fiscal and economic gloom. He was among those who brought about the nationalisation of strategic industries such as coal and steel.

Amid financial problems from 1948 to 1949, Cripps maintained a high level of social spending on housing, health, and other welfare services, while also maintaining the location of industry policy. Personal incomes and free time continued to rise, as characterised by cricket and football enjoying unprecedented booms, together with the holiday camps, the dance hall, and the cinema. In his last budget as Chancellor (1950), the housebuilding programme was restored to 200,000 per annum (after having previously been reduced due to government austerity measures), income tax was reduced for low-income earners as an overtime incentive, and spending on health, national insurance, and education was increased.

Cripps had suffered for many years from colitis, inflammation of the lower bowel; a condition aggravated by stress. In 1950, his health broke down and he was forced to resign his office in October. He resigned from Parliament the same month, and at the resulting by-election on 30 November he was succeeded as the MP for Bristol South East by Anthony Wedgwood Benn.

Personal life
Cripps was the sororal nephew of Beatrice Webb and Catherine Courtney. His mother died when he was four years old. His stepmother, Marian Ellis, had a profound influence on him. He was married to Isobel Swithinbank, who became the Honourable Lady Cripps, daughter of Harold William Swithinbank, better known as Dame Isobel Cripps (1891–1979), and had four children
 Sir John Stafford Cripps (1912–1993), journalist and campaigner, who was a conscientious objector in the Second World War  and in 1937 married Ursula Davy, having four sons and two daughters.
 Isobel Diana Cripps (1913–1985) who died unmarried
 (Anne) Theresa Cripps (1919–1998), who was married 1945 to Sir Robert Cornwallis Gerald St. Leger Ricketts, 7th Bt, and had two sons and two daughters. The elder son Sir Tristram Ricketts, 8th Bt. succeeded his father, died in 2007, and has been succeeded by his own son, Sir Stephen Ricketts, 9th Bt.
 Peggy Cripps, born Enid Margaret Cripps (1921–2006), children's author and philanthropist. Peggy Cripps shocked much British opinion by marrying the black African aristocrat Nana Joseph Emmanuel Appiah (1918–1990), a relative of the Ashanti king of Ghana, in June 1953. Peggy Appiah had one son and three daughters. Her son is the philosopher Kwame Anthony Appiah (b. May 1954 London), the Laurance S. Rockefeller professor of philosophy at Princeton University. Her three daughters live in Namibia, Nigeria, and Ghana and have eight children among them. One of them is the actor Adetomiwa Edun.

Cripps was a vegetarian, certainly for health reasons and possibly also for ethical reasons. "Cripps suffered from recurring illness which was alleviated by nature cure and a vegetarian diet...". His male-line descendants are in remainder to the barony Parmoor. In 1989, a Blue Plaque was unveiled at 32 Elm Park Gardens, Chelsea to mark the site of Cripps' birth.

Death
Cripps died aged 62 of cancer on 21 April 1952 while in Zürich, Switzerland. He was cremated at Sihlfeld Crematorium in Zurich. His ashes are buried in the churchyard in Sapperton, Gloucestershire, and his wife is buried beside him.

See also
 List of ambulance drivers during World War I
 Cripps question (patent law)

References

Further reading
 Addison, Paul. The Road To 1945: British Politics and the Second World War (1977) pp 190–210.
 Burgess, Simon. Stafford Cripps: a political life (1999)
 Byant, Chris. Stafford Cripps: the first modern chancellor (1997)
 Clarke, Peter. The Cripps Version: The Life of Sir Stafford Cripps (2002) 
 Clarke, Peter and Richard Toye, "Cripps, Sir (Richard) Stafford (1889–1952)", Oxford Dictionary of National Biography, Oxford University Press, 2004; online edn, Jan 2011 accessed 14 June 2013 doi:10.1093/ref:odnb/32630

 Dell, Edmund. The Chancellors: A History of the Chancellors of the Exchequer, 1945–90 (HarperCollins, 1997) pp 94–134, covers his term as Chancellor.

 Frame, William. "'Sir Stafford Cripps and His Friends': The Socialist League, the National Government and the Reform of the House of Lords 1931–1935," Parliamentary History (2005) 24#3 pp 316–331
 Gorodetsky, Gabriel. Stafford Cripps' Mission to Moscow, 1940–42 (1985) 361pp
 Hanak, Harry. "Sir Stafford Cripps as British Ambassador in Moscow May 1940 to June 1941." English Historical Review 94.370 (1979): 48–70. online
 Hanak, Harry. "Sir Stafford Cripps as Ambassador in Moscow, June 1941–January 1942." English Historical Review 97.383 (1982): 332–344. online
 Kitchen, Martin. British Policy Towards the Soviet Union During the Second World War (Springer, 1986).
 Lytton, Avram. "In the House of Rimmon: British Aid to the Soviet Union, June–September 1941." Journal of Slavic Military Studies 26.4 (2013): 673–704.
 Moore, R. J. Churchill, Cripps and India (Oxford UP, 1979) chapters 3–5
 Moore, R. J. "The mystery of the Cripps mission," Journal of Commonwealth Political Studies Volume 11, Issue 3, 1973, pages 195–213 online 
 Morgan, Kenneth O. Labour in Power 1945–51 (1984)
 Owen, Nicholas. "The Cripps mission of 1942: A reinterpretation." Journal of Imperial and Commonwealth History 30.1 (2002): 61–98.
 Pelling, Henry. The Labour Government 1945–51 (1984)
 Piirimäe, Kaarel. Roosevelt, Churchill, and the Baltic Question (Palgrave Macmillan, New York, 2014). pp 57–80 on "The British-Soviet Treaty, 1942." .
 Robbins, Keith. "Stafford Cripps" in Kevin Jefferys, ed., Labour Forces: From Ernie Bevin to Gordon Brown (2002) pp 63–80

Primary sources
 Cripps, Richard Stafford, and Gabriel Gorodetsky. Stafford Cripps in Moscow, 1940–1942: diaries and papers (Vallentine Mitchell, 2007).
 British War Cabinet; Sir Stafford Cripps. "Assessment On Soviet German Relations By British War Cabinet 16 July 1941" Cripps' assessment of possible war between Germany and the USSR. online
 Mansergh, Nicholas, ed. Constitutional Relations between Britain and India: The Transfer of Power, 1942–1947: Vol 1. The Cripps Mission (1970), contains all the key documents.

External links

 
 
 Blue plaque to Sir Stafford Cripps at Filkins
 
 

1889 births
1952 deaths
Alumni of University College London
Ambassadors of the United Kingdom to the Soviet Union
Anglican socialists
Burials in Gloucestershire
Chancellors of the Exchequer of the United Kingdom
European democratic socialists
English Anglicans
English Christian socialists
English King's Counsel
Fellows of the Royal Society
Independent politicians in England
Knights Bachelor
Labour Party (UK) MPs for English constituencies
Leaders of the House of Commons of the United Kingdom
Lords Privy Seal
Members of the Order of the Companions of Honour
Members of the Privy Council of the United Kingdom
Ministers in the Churchill wartime government, 1940–1945
People associated with Cranfield University
People educated at Winchester College
Presidents of the Board of Trade
Presidents of the Fabian Society
Rectors of the University of Aberdeen
Solicitors General for England and Wales
UK MPs 1929–1931
UK MPs 1931–1935
UK MPs 1935–1945
UK MPs 1945–1950
UK MPs 1950–1951
Younger sons of barons
People from Chelsea, London
Ministers in the Attlee governments, 1945–1951
20th-century English lawyers
Politicians affected by a party expulsion process